Lelwala is a small town in Sri Lanka. It is located within Southern Province.

See also
List of towns in Southern Province, Sri Lanka

External links

Populated places in Southern Province, Sri Lanka